The following are lists of constituencies for the Lok Sabha in Himachal Pradesh, India and for the Himachal Pradesh Vidhan Sabha. They are sortable by number of eligible voters.

Electors in Lok Sabha Constituency Wise

Electors in Assembly constituency Wise

District Wise Electors in Himachal Pradesh

References

 
Himachal Pradesh-related lists